Sir George Bourchier (c.1535–1605)  was an English soldier who fought and settled in Ireland. He was a member of the Privy Council of Ireland, and a Member of the Irish Parliament.

Biography
George Bourchier was the third son of John Bourchier, 2nd Earl of Bath by his second wife Eleanor Manners. He went to western Ireland as a captain in 1570 and remained there throughout the Desmond Rebellions; in 1573 he was seized by James FitzMaurice FitzGerald, he was surrendered after Essex met the Earl of Desmond near Waterford that July; he was knighted by Sir William Drury, Lord Justice of Ireland, in September 1579. He continued to command forces, and was elected Member for King's County 1585–86; was Master of the Ordnance (Ireland) 1592; a Privy Councillor (Ireland); and was sometime High Commissioner for Ecclesiastical Causes. He died on 24 September 1605.  

In 1589 he was granted  of county Limerick.

He was one of the seven signatories of a letter from the Irish Executive to the Privy Council in England (dated 4 November 1591) which inclosed the petition of the Mayor and Corporation of Dublin offering the  All Hallows site for the foundation of a university (S.P.O., Ireland, Elizabeth vol. 1611–8). Trinity College Dublin was subsequently founded on 3 March 1592. He is listed, 11 March 1591/2, as an original Founder and Benefactor having donated £30, twice.

Family
George Bourchier married Martha Howard (c. 1555–1598), daughter of William, 1st Lord Howard of Effingham by Margaret Gamage. Her brother was the Lord High Admiral Charles Lord Howard of Effingham.

Two of their sons, Charles (d. 17 September 1584) and Frederick-Philip (d. 8 March 1587), are buried in Kilkenny's cathedral of St. Canice.

The first three sons died young. The fourth one, Sir John Bourchier, Kt, (knighted 24 March 1610/11), of the manor of Clare, co. Armagh, died 25 March 1614 having been MP for county Armagh, 1613-14.

When he became 5th Earl of Bath on the death of his cousin the 4th Earl (aged 47) in March 1636/37, he added Tawstock and 36 manors in Devon and Somerset to his name.

Notes

References

Attribution
This article incorporates text from R. de Salis, R : B : M, London, 2009.

Further reading
William Urwick, The Early History of Trinity College Dublin, 1591–1660, London & Dublin, 1892.
McDowell & Webb, Trinity College Dublin, Cambridge University Press, 1982.
G. E. Cokayne, Vicary Gibbs, The Complete Peerage, volume II, page 19, The St. Catherine Press, London, 1912 (the series was published: 1910-1959).
Todd Gray (ed), Devon Household Accounts 1627-59 Part II, Devon and Cornwall Record Society, 1996.
Fane de Salis MSS.
John Bateman, Great Landowners, 1883.
Rev. James Graves & John G. Augustus Prim, The History, Architecture, and Antiquities of the Cathedral Church of St. Canice, Kilkenny, Dublin, 1857.
 A Biographical History of England, from Egbert the Great to the Revolution: consisting of characters disposed in different classes, and adapted to a methodical catalogue of engraved British Heads: intended as an essay towards reducing our biography to system, and to a help to the knowledge of portraits: interspersed with a variety of anecdotes, and memoirs of a great number of persons, not to be found in any other biographical work. With a preface, shewing the utility of a collection of engraved portraits to supply the defect, and answer the various purposes, of medals, by the Rev. James Granger (1723–1776), vicar of Shiplake in Oxfordshire. Fifth edition, volume IV out of VI, London, 1824. (First edition was 1769). (Page 78, a description of the Countess of Bath's portrait by Van Dyck).
Oswald Barron, The Fanes, in Ancestor, January 1905, xii, 9-10.
Oswald Barron, FSA (ed), Northamptonshire Families, (VCH), Archibald Constable, London, 1906.

George
1530s births
1605 deaths
16th-century Anglo-Irish people
Irish MPs 1585–1586
Members of the Parliament of Ireland (pre-1801) for King's County constituencies